Pacific Drums and Percussion (or PDP for short) is a musical instrument brand established by the Drum Workshop Inc., in 1999, with the purpose of providing its percussion instruments at more affordable prices.

Pacific Drums products are manufactured in China. Taiwan and Mexico. The line still uses some custom techniques, but primarily uses computerized machinery to cut costs and reduce steps to create drums in large quantities.

Current line of Pacific Drums instruments are drum kits, snares, hardware, pedals, and other accessories.

Product lines

Drum kits 
Concept Series - is a new line of PDP drums that are available in both all-maple or all-birch shells. All shells are 7-ply, except for the snare which is 10-ply. Concept Series Drums are loaded with high-end features, 10-ply Concept snares come standard with the trusted DW MAG throw-off, along with fully-chromed snare wires, featuring carbon steel coils and chrome end plates. With professional-level features that unquestionably honor its DW roots, the PDP Concept Series delivers high-quality, original style that you can see and hear. 
Spectrum - PDP's intermediate shell pack which includes hybrid Maple/Poplar shells with matte lacquer finishes. Complete with floating tom mounts and fine threaded true pitch tension rods. Shell sizes (depth x diameter): 8" x 10" and 9" x 12" toms, 14" x 16" floor tom, 18" x 22" bass drum, 5.5" x 14" snare These kits are intended to provide a bridge between the Mainstage and Concept Series lines.
New Yorker - is a new line of compact drums with poplar shells.  Available in a choice of 2 wraps.
Mainstage - PDP's latest entry level kit that includes hardware, cymbals, and drum throne.
Encore - PDP's entry level drum kit made with poplar shells normally sold as a full package with hardware and cymbals included. Available in many different configurations and 5 colors.
Centerstage - PDP's entry level kit with poplar shells and looks exactly like the encore. The badge seems to be the only difference.  
Z5 - PDP's entry level of drums that are all-wood construction, FinishPly wrap, and an array of five color choices.
PDP Player - A junior drum kit which includes a kick drum, two rack toms, a floor tom, and a snare. This kit also comes with a crash/ride cymbal, a set of hi-hats, and a child-sized throne.
X7 - As the name implies, these kits are pre-configured as a 7 piece kit. They were made from poplar (up until 2009), and came with both lacquer and wrap finishes. For 2009, the X7 kit featured all-maple shells. Pearlescent Black replaced Orange Sparkle for 2010. Purple Sparkle is also available. (Made in China)
M5 - The  M5 shell kit is all maple. Like the FS series, 8" and 16" add-on toms were available.
FS - These drums are made from Birch and come with matte lacquer finishes. These drums were pre-configured as a fusion kit with 8" and 16" toms available as add-ons.
Platinum Series - PDP's top-of-the-line drums made from maple. These drums came in a wide range of sizes and four different types of finishes (FinishPly, Satin, Lacquer, and Exotic). For 2010, only four finishes are available. The series was discontinued in 2011.
805 - Drums made from Birch and come in either a lacquer or wrap finishes and powder-coated hardware, with Fusion and Rock sizes available. The series was discontinued in 2009.
LX/LXE - Drums made from maple and came in a lacquer finish. LXE series drums came in exotic lacquer finishes. (Made in Ensenada, Mexico)
MX/MXR - Drums made from maple and came in satin finish. MXR series drums were available in rock sizes.
CX/CXR - Drums made from maple and came in a FinishPly wrap. CXR series drums were available in rock sizes.(the finest drums made by PDP, DW Quality made in Ensenada,  Mexico)
EX - Entry level kits constructed from composite wood shells. Normally sold with 700 series hardware this series has been discontinued as the first series came out in 2000. 
FX/FXR - Drums made from birch and come in a lacquer. FXR series drums were available in rock sizes. Replaced by the FS series.
EZ - A budget-priced entry-level drumset. Replaced by the Z5 series.

Snares 

Concept Series - Black Nickel over Steel (Available in sizes 6.5"x 14", 6.5"x 13", 5.5"x 14", 6"x 12", and 6"x 10")
Specialty - LTD Classic Wood Hoop (Available in sizes 6"x 14" and 7"x 14") LTD Bubinga (Available in sizes 5.5"x 14", 6.5"x 14", 7"x 13", and 8"x 14") LTD Birch (Available in sizes 5.5"x14", 6.5"x14)
Black Wax - Maple Snares (Available in sizes 5.5"x 14", 5.5"x 13", 6.5"x 14", 7"x 13", 6"x 12", and 6"x 10")
Other* - Black Nickel over Brass Ace of Spades Snare (Available in sizes 5"x 14" and 6.5"x 14"  
Mainstage (Available only in 6"x 10")
Chrome over Steel Piccolo (Available only in 13"x 3.5")
Limited bubinga (Available in sizes 6.5"x 14" , 5.5"x 14" , 7"x 13" , 8"x 14")
SX Series Hammered brass
SX Series Dual beaded brass
 Eric Hernandez "e-Panda" Signature Snare 
 Chad Smith Clear Acrylic Signature Snare

Hardware 

700 Series -  PDDT720 Tractor Throne
PDHH700 3-Legged Hi Hat Stand (20' Min / 25" Max Height)
PDCB700 Straight/Boom Cymbal Stand
PDSS700 Snare Stand (18" Min / 25" Max Height)
PDCS700 Straight Cymbal Stand
PDDT700 Throne (20" Min / 25" Max Height)
800 Series -  PDCB800 Straight/Boom Cymbal Stand
PDCS800 Straight Cymbal Stand
PDDT820-X Tractor Throne (21" Min / 28" Max Height)
PDHH800-01 3-Legged Hi Hat Stand
PDSS800 Snare Stand (17" Min / 21" Max Height)
PDHH820 2-Legged Hi Hat Stand
PDDT800-04 Standard Throne (21" Min/ 28" Max Height)
Concept Series - PDHHC20 2-Legged Hi Hat Stand 
PDHHC00 3-Legged Hi Hat Stand
PDSSC00 Snare Stand (16" Min / 24" Max Height)
PDDTC00 Throne (22" Min / 28" MAX Height)
PDCSC00 Straight Cymbal Stand
PDCBC00 Boom Cymbal Stand
PDTSC90 Double Tom Stand

Pedals 

500 Series - SP500 Single Pedal and DP502 Double Pedal features:
Dual Chain Drive
Auxiliary Side Base Plate
Side Adjustable Toe Clamp
Two-Way Beater Ball
Offset Cam
400 Series - SP400 Single Pedal and DP402 Double Pedal features:
Two-Way Beater Ball
Auxiliary Side Base Plate
Offset Cam
Lefty Version of 402 Available
Concept Series - Direct Drive Single Pedal and Double Pedal features:
Cobalt Low-Mass Drive Train
Retractable Spurs
Needle Bearing Hinges
DW Air Beater (felt/plastic)
XF Extended Footboard (270mm / 10.6")
Offset Toe Clamp
DW Spring Rocker Adjustment 
Dual Base-Plate (double)

Artists 
Artist who use/have used PDP drums are:
 Jordan Mancino (As I Lay Dying) 
 The Rev (Avenged Sevenfold) 
 Chad Smith (Red Hot Chili Peppers) 
 Eric Hernández (Bruno Mars) 
 Daru Jones (Jack White) 
 Johnny Rabb (Collective Soul) 
 Gary "Zeus" Smith (The Fifth and Aittala)

Notes

References

External links
 Official website

Percussion instrument manufacturing companies
Musical instrument manufacturing companies of the United States
Manufacturing companies based in California
Companies based in Oxnard, California